Traian Crişan (21 May 1918 – 6 November 1990) was a Romanian prelate of the Roman Catholic Church and served as Secretary Emeritus of the Congregation for the Causes of Saints as well being the Titular Bishop of Drivastum.

Born in Iara, Austria-Hungary (present-day Romania), Crişan was ordained as a Greek Catholic priest on 25 March 1945. On 7 December 1981 he was appointed to the Holy See as the Secretary of the Congregation for the Causes of Saints and given the title Titular Bishop of Drivastum, going on to being ordained bishop on 6 January 1982.

Bishop Crişan died on 6 November 1990.

References

1918 births
1990 deaths
Romanian Greek-Catholic bishops
20th-century Roman Catholic titular bishops
Members of the Congregation for the Causes of Saints